Andrew Greg Smith (born 22 December 1989) is a footballer playing as a striker for Accrington Stanley. He made his debut for Stanley on 19 April 2008 in the Football League Two clash with Barnet which ended in a 2–0 loss to Stanley.

References

External links

1989 births
Living people
English footballers
Accrington Stanley F.C. players
Clitheroe F.C. players
Footballers from Burnley
English Football League players
Association football forwards